Scott Patrick MacRae (born August 13, 1974) is an American former professional baseball pitcher. He played in Major League Baseball (MLB) for the Cincinnati Reds. He was active in the Cincinnati Reds organization from 6/1/1995 to 10/15/2004, and was active with the Houston Astros 3/2/2005 to 10/15/2005.

Career
During his years of being active, he was often said to be a humorous member of the clubhouse, and was nicknamed "The Golden Ab". He was born in Dearborn, Michigan on 8/13/1974, and attended College at Valdosta State University. He throws and hits right-handed, and was drafted 895th in the 1995 draft. He also served as a Peace Corps volunteer in Zalischyky, Ukraine for over two years teaching elementary students. He was known for mixing up his Ukrainian with his English, and often speaks in Ukrainian while meaning to speak English. He was a coach for the Headfirst baseball program.

References

External links

1974 births
Living people
Sportspeople from Dearborn, Michigan
Baseball players from Michigan
Major League Baseball pitchers
Cincinnati Reds players
Valdosta State Blazers baseball players
Gulf Coast Reds players
Billings Mustangs players
Charleston AlleyCats players
Burlington Bees players
Potomac Cannons players
Chattanooga Lookouts players
Louisville RiverBats players
Louisville Bats players
Corpus Christi Hooks players
Round Rock Express players